Jules Boykoff (born September 11, 1970) is an American academic, author, poet, and former athlete. He is a former professional soccer player. His research focuses on the politics of the Olympic Games, social movements, the suppression of dissent, and the role of the mass media in US politics, especially regarding coverage of climate change issues.

Boykoff has written four books on the Olympic Games, and he has written essays in The New York Times, The Guardian, The Washington Post, NBC News, Los Angeles Times, The Nation, and Jacobin. He has appeared on BBC, CNN, CNBC, NPR, CBC Television, CTV Television Network, Al Jazeera English, Democracy Now!, and The Majority Report with Sam Seder.

Life and work

Soccer career

At the college level, Boykoff played two years for the University of Wisconsin before crossing to the University of Portland. After graduating he was drafted in 1993 by indoor soccer team Portland Pride of the Continental Indoor Soccer League (CISL). He also played with National Professional Soccer League team Milwaukee Wave. In all he played four seasons of indoor professional soccer.

At the age of 19, he played for the United States men's national under-23 soccer team in the 1990 Toulon Tournament. The United States Soccer Federation entered the 1990, 1991 and 1992 editions in preparation for the 1992 Summer Olympics football tournament.

Academic career
Boykoff is currently a professor of Politics and Government at Pacific University, Oregon.  In 2007 and 2009, students selected him as recipient of the Trombley Award for teaching excellence.  He also held a visiting professor position at Whitman College in Walla Walla, Washington during the 2004–2005 school year.

Common course topics taught by Boykoff include US politics, the politics of surveillance, mass-media and politics, and the politics of literature and poetry.  In November 2006, he spoke at the United Nations Climate Change Conference in Nairobi, Kenya, "COP 12".  In An Inconvenient Truth, Al Gore mentioned work Boykoff co-authored with his brother Maxwell Boykoff (Oxford University, Environmental Change Institute) on US media coverage of global warming.

Boykoff is also co-editor of The Tangent, a politics and art zine, and runs The Tangent Reading Series in Portland, Oregon.

Critique of the Olympic Games 
Boykoff has been called “one of the biggest names in international Olympic Games academia" and is known for his informed criticism of the Olympic Games.

Common themes in Boykoff's Olympics work include overspending, corruption, militarization of the public sphere and police, gentrification, and greenwashing.

Boykoff lived in London in the lead up to and during the 2012 Summer Olympics and in Rio de Janeiro as a Fulbright scholar during preparations for the 2016 Summer Olympics.

In July 2019 he interviewed two women in Tokyo who were displaced by the 1964 Summer Olympics and the 2020 Summer Olympics.

In June 2021 Boykoff debated Richard W. Pound of the International Olympic Committee.

Bibliography

Books

Nonfiction 

 The Suppression of Dissent: How the State and Mass Media Squelch USAmerican Social Movements: Routledge, 2006. I ISBN 978-0415978101
 Beyond Bullets: The Suppression of Dissent in the United States: AK Press, 2007. I ISBN 978-1904859598
 Landscapes of Dissent: Guerrilla Poetry & Public Space, co-authored by Kaia Sand: Palm Press, 2008. I ISBN 978-0978926243
 Celebration Capitalism and the Olympic Games: Routledge, 2013. I ISBN 9780415821971
 Activism and the Olympics: Dissent at the Games in Vancouver and London: Rutgers University Press, 2014. I ISBN 978-0813562018
 Power Games: A Political History of the Olympics: Verso Books, 2016. I ISBN 9781784780722
 NOlympians: Inside the Fight Against Capitalist Mega-Sports in Los Angeles, Tokyo and Beyond: Fernwood Publishing, 2020. I ISBN 9781773632766

Poetry 

 Once Upon a Neoliberal Rocket Badge: Edge Books, 2006. I ISBN 978-1890311216
 The Slow Motion Underneath (Hot Dream), collaboration with Jim Dine: Steidl, 2009. I ISBN 9783865216939
 Hegemonic Love Potion: Factory School, 2009. I ISBN 978-1600010620
 Fireworks: Tinfish Press, 2018. I ISBN 978-0998743875

References

External links
 Pacific University Faculty Page
 Interview in Pacific Magazine

American political scientists
Living people
Sustainability advocates
Pacific University faculty
Whitman College faculty
1970 births
American soccer players
Portland Pride players
Milwaukee Wave players
Wisconsin Badgers men's soccer players
Portland Pilots men's soccer players
University of Portland alumni
Association footballers not categorized by position
National Professional Soccer League (1984–2001) players
United States men's youth international soccer players
Soccer players from Wisconsin
Continental Indoor Soccer League players
Sportspeople from Madison, Wisconsin